Hodu-gwaja ("walnut cookie"), commonly translated as walnut cookies, walnut cakes, and walnut pastries, is a type of cookie originated from Cheonan, South Korea. It is also known by the name hodo-gwaja (which is not the Standard Korean spelling but the name used by Hakhwa walnut cookies, the company that first produced the confection.) in and outside Korea.

It is a walnut-shaped baked confection with red bean paste filling, whose outer dough is made of skinned and pounded walnuts and wheat flour. Ones that are made in Cheonan, South Chungcheong Province, are called "Cheonan hodu-gwaja" and are a local specialty.

History 
Hodu-gwaja was first made in 1934 by Jo Gwigeum and Sim Boksun, who were a married couple living in Cheonan. The method was developed based on those of traditional Korean confectioneries.

Outside Cheonan, it was popularized in the 1970s, often sold in train stations and inside the train via catering trolleys. Nowadays it is sold in most regions in South Korea including Seoul, and in the cities of other countries, such as Los Angeles and San Diego in the United States.

Gallery

See also 
 Hangwa
 Hwangnam-ppang

References

External links 
  Hakhwa Walnut Cookies

Korean confectionery
Korean snack food
Street food in South Korea
Cookies
Walnut dishes
Stuffed desserts